FEU Alabang is a private, non-sectarian trimestral, coeducational higher education institution located in Alabang, Muntinlupa, Philippines.  Founded on July 21, 2016 as the sixth campus of the Far Eastern University, it offers Senior High School, Engineering, and Computer Studies programs.

FEU Alabang is an annex campus of the FEU Institute of Technology, headed by Dr. Benson T. Tan as Senior Executive Director. The deans, professors, faculties, and grading system of the university are all managed by FEU Tech.

Like its sister schools, FEU Tech and FEU Diliman, the college runs on a trimester academic system. An academic year starts in the second week of August and ends every June.

History 
FEU Alabang primarily caters to students in the Southern Metro Manila area. Established in 2018, the school offers various degree programs including science, engineering, and technology.

In 2018, the  campus welcomed almost 2,000 students to the 14-storey academic building. The campus also features a 200-seater chapel and gymnasium.

In March 2020, FEU Alabang opened its gymnasium for the front line health care workers of the Research Institute for Tropical Medicine (RITM) and to help fight the COVID-19 that is rampaging across the country. The campus, being 300 meters away from RITM, allotted 50 beds and a 12-seater lounge as well as a shower, toilet and locker facilities.

Academics

Senior High School 

 Academic Track
STEM (Science, Technology, Engineering and Mathematics)
HUMSS (Humanities and Social Sciences)
ABM (Accountancy, Business and Management)
GAS (General Academic Strand)

College of Accounts and Business 
 Bachelor of Science in Accountancy
 Bachelor of Science in Business Administration major in Financial Management and Business Analytics
 Bachelor of Science in Business Administration major in Marketing Management and Multimedia Design
 Bachelor of Science in Business Administration major in Operations and Service Management

College of Computer Studies and Multimedia Arts 
 Bachelor of Science in Computer Science
 Specialization in Software Engineering
 Bachelor of Science in Multimedia Arts
 Specialization in Animation and Digital Film
 Bachelor of Science in Information Technology
 Specialization in Digital Arts
 Specialization in Animation and Game Development
 Specialization in Web and Mobile Applications
 Specialization in Service Management and Business Analytics

College of Engineering 
 Bachelor of Science in Civil Engineering
 Bachelor of Science in Computer Engineering
 Bachelor of Science in Electrical Engineering
 Bachelor of Science in Electronics and Communications Engineering
 Bachelor of Science in Manufacturing Engineering
 Bachelor of Science in Mechanical Engineering

Campus 
FEU Alabang's campus is designed by Arch. Carmelo Casas of Casas + Architects. He prioritized sustainability for the structure, using the sun's orientation and prevailing wind direction for light conservation and proper ventilation to students and faculties. The main academic building can accommodate up to 18,000 students.

In February 2020, the Our Lady of Lourdes Chapel was inaugurated. It was headed by FEU President Dr. Michael Alba, FEU Chair Emeritus Dr. Lourdes Reyes Montinola, FEU Chief Finance Officer Johnny Montinola, and Dr. Tan. In September, following its inauguration, Casas + Architects received 5 stars for Public Architecture from the Red Carpet Asia Pacific Property for their work on the chapel.

References

Far Eastern University
Education in Muntinlupa